Norbert Lattenstein (born 13 February 1984 in Székesfehérvár) is a Hungarian footballer. His current club is FC Ajka.

External links
 HLSZ profile 

1984 births
Living people
Sportspeople from Székesfehérvár
Hungarian footballers
Association football midfielders
Fehérvár FC players
FC Felcsút players
Szombathelyi Haladás footballers
BFC Siófok players
Budaörsi SC footballers
FC Ajka players
Nemzeti Bajnokság I players